The following is a list of the 194 communes of the Essonne department of France.

The communes cooperate in the following intercommunalities (as of 2020):
Métropole du Grand Paris (partly)
Communauté d'agglomération Cœur d'Essonne
Communauté d'agglomération Étampois Sud Essonne
Communauté d'agglomération Grand Paris Sud Seine-Essonne-Sénart (partly)
Communauté d'agglomération Paris-Saclay
Communauté d'agglomération Val d'Yerres Val de Seine
Communauté d'agglomération Versailles Grand Parc (partly)
Communauté de communes des 2 Vallées
Communauté de communes Le Dourdannais en Hurepoix
Communauté de communes Entre Juine et Renarde
Communauté de communes de l'Orée de la Brie (partly)
Communauté de communes du Pays de Limours
Communauté de communes du Val d'Essonne

References

Essonne